Elija Godwin (born July 1, 1999) is an American athlete who specialises in the 400 metres.

Career

Early career
From Covington, Georgia and a student at the University of Georgia. Initially, Godwin only ran on the track to condition himself for football. Then, once he began to train more seriously he would run mostly 100m and 200m. This was until his coach Kevin Barnes looking at his split times and suggested he run an open 400m race. Godwin ran 47.40 for the 400m at his first race.

Javelin injury
On May 7, 2019, Godwin suffered a serious injury during a training session when he was impaled by a javelin whilst running backward sprints at Georgia track and field practice, prior to the 2019 SEC Outdoor Track and Field Championships. The accident left Godwin with wounds to his back and shoulder and collapsed his left lung. Emergency services attended to him and ground off part of the javelin before he was taken to Piedmont Athens Regional Medical Centre, where the rest of it was removed by surgeons.

2021
On May 15, 2021 he ran a personal best 44.61 at the Cushing stadium in Texas at the SEC Outdoor Championships to meet the Olympic qualifying standard. At the NCAA Outdoor Championships, Hayward Field, Eugene, Oregon he finished fourth in his heat in a time of 46.18.

He qualified for the final of the USA men’s Olympic Trials 400m race, running 44.81 and 45.10 in the heats. In the final he placed sixth and qualified for US men’s relay pool for the 4x400m at the 2020 Summer Games. At the Olympics he won a Bronze medal as part of the American Mixed 4 × 400 metres relay team.

2022
Indoors, Godwin finished 7th in his heat of the 400m at the SEC Championships and did not make the final, but returned to anchor the University of Georgia's 4x400m team with a winning 44.95 leg. At the NCAA Indoor Championships, he finished 4th in his heat of the 400m and anchored Georgia to 4th in the 4x400m final.
Outdoors, Godwin was the runner-up at the SEC Championship meet in 44.81, behind Champion Allison of Florida who ran 44.74. At the NCAA Championships in Eugene, Oregon, Godwin placed 3rd in a personal-best 44.50 behind Allison (44.41) and defending champion Randolph Ross (44.13) of North Carolina A&T. Competing for the United States at the 2022 World Athletics Championships in Eugene, Oregon Godwin won bronze in the mixed 4x400m relay and then gold in the men’s 4x400m relay, completing the first leg in a team also consisting of Michael Norman, Bryce Deadmon and Champion Allison.

Personal life
His mother, Ginger Luby, was working her job as an administrator in a doctor’s office when she received the call that Elija had been injured by the javelin in 2019. Godwin has one brother, Okon Godwin and a sister, Kyaundra Ward. He graduated from Newton High School in Covington, Georgia in 2018. Godwin received special recognition from Covington’s city council by way of a proclamation that made 10 September 2022 “Elija Godwin” day.

References

External links 
 
 
 
 
 

1999 births
Living people
American male sprinters
People from Covington, Georgia
Georgia Bulldogs track and field athletes
Track and field athletes from Georgia (U.S. state)
African-American track and field athletes
Athletes (track and field) at the 2020 Summer Olympics
Medalists at the 2020 Summer Olympics
Olympic bronze medalists for the United States in track and field
21st-century African-American sportspeople
World Athletics Championships medalists
World Athletics Championships winners